Naushon may refer to:

 Naushon Island, one of the Elizabeth Islands in Gosnold, Massachusetts
 USS Naushon (SP-517), a United States Navy patrol vessel in commission from 1918 to 1919

 , a United States Coast Guard Island-class patrol boat
 , a car ferry operating in Massachusetts from 1957 to 1987